Songs of Pride...Charley That Is is the fifth studio album by American country music artist Charley Pride released in 1968 via RCA Records (1971 in the UK from which the following track listing was obtained). It reached number 6 on the Billboard Top Country Albums chart.

Track listing

Production
Produced by Chet Atkins, Jack Clement, and Felton Jarvis
Recorded in RCA's "Nashville Sound" Studio, Nashville, Tennessee
Recording Engineers: Jim Malloy, Tom Pick and Al Pachucki

References

1968 albums
Charley Pride albums
Albums produced by Chet Atkins
Albums produced by Jack Clement
Albums produced by Bob Ferguson (music)
Albums produced by Felton Jarvis
RCA Records albums